Narendra Marutrao Kamble (24 October 1925 – 3 April 2021) was an Indian politician. He was a Member of Parliament  representing Maharashtra in the Rajya Sabha the upper house of India's Parliament as member of the Indian National Congress. He was the Vice-Chairman of the National Commission for Scheduled Castes. He was an Ambedkarite and Buddhist. He died on 3 April 2021.

References

1925 births
2021 deaths
Rajya Sabha members from Maharashtra
Indian National Congress politicians
Republican Party of India politicians
Indian Buddhists
Marathi politicians
People from Satara district
Indian National Congress politicians from Maharashtra